In Hinduism, an  (Sanskrit: अस्त्र) was a supernatural weapon, presided over by a specific deity and imbued with spiritual and occult powers that caused its effect or impact. Later the word came to denote any weapon which was used by releasing it from one's hand (e.g. an arrow), compared to keeping it one's hand (e.g. a sword) (Shastra). In Ramayana and Mahabharata, Rama had more astras than any other warrior. It is believed that Rama possessed all astras. Various texts have stated that Arjuna possessed almost all astras except  Narayanastra.

Astradhari
The bearer of the weapon is called an Astradhari (Sanskrit: अस्त्रधारी).

Summoning of Astra
To summon or use an astra required use of a specific incantation or invocation. The deity invoked would then endow the weapon with supernatural powers, making it impossible to counter through regular means. Specific conditions existed involving the usage of astras, the violation of which could be fatal. Because of the power involved, the knowledge involving an astra was passed in the Guru-shishya tradition from a Guru (teacher) to a Shishya (pupil) by word of mouth alone, and only following the establishment of the student's character. Certain astras had to be handed down from the deity involved directly, knowledge of the incantation being insufficient.

Astras in Hindu epics

Astras come into importance mainly in the Ramayana and Mahabharata, where they are used in the great battles described in each epic. They are depicted as used by archers such as Parashurama, Rama, Lakshman, Meghanada (Indrajit), Ravana, Bhishma, Drona, Karna, Ashwatthama, Arjuna and other warriors.

The divya ("divine") astras were generally invoked into arrows, although they could potentially be used with anything. Ashwatthama invoked Brahmashirsha astra using a blade of grass as his weapon. Arjuna was capable of shooting all of his celestial weapons including Pashupatastra by the power of his mind alone.

See also

 Astras of Arjuna
 The Ramayana
 The Mahabharata
 Bhagavata Purana

References

Weapons in Hindu mythology